Yasmin Umar is a Bruneian politician who previously held the positions of Minister of Energy from 2010 to 2018 and Deputy Minister of Defence from 2005 to 2010.

Biography

Early life and education 
On 23 April 1956, Yasmin was born. His Bachelor of Science (Hons) in Electronics degree from the University of Wales was awarded to him on 12 July 1979. He continued on to the University of Loughborough to pursue a Master's degree in Digital Communication Systems, and on 1 December 1981, he received his Master of Science from the faculty of Electrical and electronic engineering. On 25 June 1986, the Institution of Chartered Engineers presented him with the certified Chartered Engineer (C Eng) insignia. On 28 April 2008, he has been a Fellow of the Institute of Engineering and Technology (IET) in the United Kingdom. He has also taken classes, seminars, and workshops in the United Kingdom, Australia, Singapore, Japan, and the United States. The 22nd Army Staff Course Division 1 at the Royal Military College of Science (RMCS), United Kingdom, in 1987; the Defence Research Fellow Exchange Program at the National Institute of Defence Studies, Japan, in 1991; and the Defence College, Australia, in 1999 are a few examples.

Military career 
Yasmin joined the Royal Brunei Armed Forces as an officer, and on 9 November 1981, he was promoted to Lieutenant. He has held a variety of positions in the fields of policy, corporate management, logistics, and strategy. He began his career as an engineering officer and was first employed by the Royal Brunei Navy as a weapons engineering officer. He was appointed Senior Engineering Officer to lead the Naval Engineering Department on 1 April 1988. On 14 September 1990, he was appointed Head of Research in the Defence Minister's Office and Directorate of Strategic Planning (DMO/DSP). Two years later, he accepted a position as a Staff Officer Grade 1 Maintenance at the Directorate of Logistics, where he was in charge of creating the maintenance guidelines for equipment used by the Armed Forces. He was reassigned to DMO/DSP on 2 May 1994, to fill a Staff Officer Grade 1 position. He was named Director of Intelligence and Security on 14 July 1995, and he held that position through December 1998.

Political career 
Yasmin was appointed by Sultan Hassanal Bolkiah as an official member of the legislative council on 6 September 2004, and on 24 May 2005, he was appointed deputy minister of defense at the Sultan's direction. He was appointed as the Prime Minister's Office's Minister of Energy since 29 May 2010. On 7 May 2017, the Saudi Arabian government's Ministry of Energy, Industry and Mineral Resources, Khalid Al-Falih, paid Yasmin a courtesy call to further strengthen the close relationship and cooperation between Brunei and the Saudi Arabia.

Personal life
Yasmin married Datin Hajah Noryasimah binti Abdullah on 5 August 1983, and they had a daughter together.

Honours 
On 1 May 2010, he was awarded the Fellow of Pertubuhan Ukur Jurutera & Arkitek Brunei. Pehin Yasmin Umar received the DUBC medal for his remarkable efforts in fostering the strong defense connections between Singapore and Brunei while serving as Brunei's deputy defense minister from 2005 to 2010. Moreover, he has earned the following honours;

National 
  Order of Seri Paduka Mahkota Brunei First Class (SPMB) – Dato Seri Paduka (15 July 2006)
  Order of Setia Negara Brunei First Class (PSNB) – Dato Seri Setia (15 July 2011)
  Sultan Hassanal Bolkiah Medal First Class (PHBS) – (15 July 2010)
  Silver Jubilee Medal – (5 October 1992)
  Golden Jubilee Medal – (5 October 2017)
  Proclamation of Independence Medal – (1 January 1984)
  Royal Brunei Armed Forces Silver Jubilee Medal – (31 May 1986)
  Royal Brunei Armed Forces Golden Jubilee Medal – (31 May 2011)

Foreign 
 :
  Distinguished Service Order (DUBC) – (16 June 2011)
 :
  Order of Independence Grand Cordon – (13 May 2008)
 :
  Order of Sikatuna Grand Cross (GCrS) – (24 August 2008)

References

Living people
1956 births
Government ministers of Brunei
Members of the Legislative Council of Brunei
Bruneian military personnel
Grand Cordons of the Order of Independence (Jordan)